George Chelston Springer III (born September 19, 1989) is an American professional baseball outfielder for the Toronto Blue Jays of Major League Baseball (MLB). He played for the Houston Astros from 2014 to 2020.

The Astros selected Springer in the first round (11th overall) of the 2011 MLB draft. He made his MLB debut in 2014, for the Astros. Springer has played primarily in center field and also spent significant time in right field. A native of New Britain, Connecticut, Springer is of Puerto Rican and Panamanian descent.

Springer played college baseball at the University of Connecticut, where he was named Big East Conference Baseball Player of the Year and a First Team All-American. In 2017, Springer became an MLB All-Star, Silver Slugger Award winner, and World Series champion. He was also named the 2017 World Series Most Valuable Player (MVP), hitting a record-tying five home runs (Reggie Jackson and Chase Utley accomplished the feat in 1977 and 2009, respectively), as the Astros defeated the Los Angeles Dodgers in seven games. He was again an All-Star in 2018, 2019, and 2022.

Amateur career
Springer attended New Britain High School in New Britain, Connecticut, for his freshman year of high school. He played on the varsity baseball team as a freshman despite standing  and weighing . Springer transferred to Avon Old Farms School in Avon, Connecticut, for his sophomore through senior seasons. He repeated his junior year as his grades dropped. Springer played for the Avon Old Farms baseball team. The Minnesota Twins selected Springer in the 48th round of the 2008 MLB draft. Though he considered signing with Minnesota, he decided that he was not ready for professional baseball and did not sign.

Springer enrolled at the University of Connecticut (UConn), where he played college baseball for the Connecticut Huskies baseball team. At UConn, Springer was named to the 2009 Baseball America Freshman All-America First Team. He was also named the Big East Conference rookie of the year. In 2009 and 2010, he played collegiate summer baseball with the Wareham Gatemen of the Cape Cod Baseball League. In 2011, Springer was named the Big East Player of the Year. He was named a first team All-American by Perfect Game USA, Louisville Slugger. and National Collegiate Baseball Writers Association, while being named a Second Team All-American by Baseball America.

Professional career

Minor leagues
The Houston Astros selected Springer in the first round, with the 11th overall selection, in the 2011 MLB draft. Springer became the highest selection in the MLB Draft in University of Connecticut baseball history. Springer was signed by the Astros, receiving a $2.52 million signing bonus. After he signed, Springer played in eight games with the Tri-City ValleyCats of the Class A-Short Season New York–Penn League. Before the 2012 season, MLB.com rated Springer as the 84th best prospect in baseball.

In 2012, Springer played for the Lancaster JetHawks of the Class A-Advanced California League and the Corpus Christi Hooks of the Class AA Texas League. He hit 22 home runs and recorded 28 stolen bases for Lancaster. Splitting the 2013 season between Corpus Christi and the Oklahoma City RedHawks of the Class AAA Pacific Coast League, Springer joined the 30–30 club, recording more than 30 home runs and stolen bases. He appeared in the Texas League All-Star Game, and was named its most valuable player. Though he only played in 73 games for Corpus Christi, he was named the Texas League Player of the Year at the end of the season. He was a finalist for USA Todays Minor League Player of the Year Award.

Baseball America ranked Springer as the 18th-best prospect in baseball prior to the 2014 season. During spring training in 2014, Springer and his agent rejected a reported seven-year contract worth $23 million, despite having not yet reached the major leagues. Springer started the 2014 season with Oklahoma City. He hit for a .353 batting average and a .647 slugging percentage before being called up to the major league team in time for their April 16 game.

Houston Astros

2014
Springer made his MLB debut on April 16, 2014, at Minute Maid Park against the Kansas City Royals. Batting second and playing right field, Springer collected his first career hit, an infield single, against Royals pitcher Jeremy Guthrie. Springer hit the first home run of his MLB career on May 8, 2014 at Comerica Park off Detroit Tigers pitcher Drew Smyly. On June 26, Springer hit his 15th home run, becoming the first Astros rookie to reach that mark before the All-Star break. On July 23, 2014, Springer was placed on the 15-day disabled list due to a left quad strain. On September 16, the Astros announced Springer would not play for the remainder of the 2014 season.  He played in 78 games in 2014, batting .231 with 20 home runs, 51 runs batted in (RBIs), and 114 strikeouts.

2015
During a game against the Texas Rangers on April 12, 2015, Springer robbed Leonys Martín of a potential game-winning grand slam by making a leaping catch by the wall in the 10th inning. The Astros would go on to win over the Rangers 6–4 in 14 innings. Springer, along with José Altuve, Carlos Correa and Dallas Keuchel, became a key figure in the 2015 Houston Astros playoff run. The Astros won the MLB wild card, making the MLB postseason for the first time in 10 years. They lost to the future World Champion Kansas City Royals 3 games to 2 in the 2015 American League Division Series. During that series the Astros had a lead in all 5 games.

2016
After consistently cutting down on his strikeout rate from his rookie year, Springer improved the quality of his at bats enough in 2016, that by May, the Astros made him their regular leadoff hitter.  He led the American League with 744 plate appearances, playing in all 162 regular season games.  He set new career highs with 116 runs scored, 29 home runs, and 88 walks.  The Astros finished 84–78, ranking in third place in the AL West and missing the playoffs.

2017
After spending the first three seasons of his career in right field, the Astros shifted Springer to center field in 2017.  He was selected as the American League Player of the Week for the first time in June. He also made his first MLB All-Star team played at Marlins Park in Miami, elected by the fans as a starter.  Typically the Astros' leadoff hitter, he batted cleanup for the American League lineup, as was the decision of former Astros manager Brad Mills, the AL manager.  The Astros took a 60–29 record into the All-Star break, the best 89-game start in franchise history.

On July 28, Springer was placed on the 10-day disabled list due to left quad discomfort. On September 29, prior to a game against the Boston Red Sox at Fenway Park, Springer met and reunited with a first grade teacher of whom he knew during his childhood at New Britain. Springer finished 2017 by playing 140 games with a .283 batting average, 34 home runs, and 85 RBI.

With the Astros finishing the season 101–61, the team clinched the AL West division. The Astros advanced to the World Series to face the Los Angeles Dodgers.  Springer struck out four times in Game 1.  In Game 2, he, along with two Astros teammates–Carlos Correa and José Altuve—and two Dodgers players–Charlie Culberson and Yasiel Puig—all homered in extra innings as the Astros prevailed, 7–6.  The five home runs accounted for the most hit in extra innings of any single game in major league history.

In the Astros' 5–1 Game 7 Series-clinching victory, he homered and doubled, finishing with two runs and two RBI.  In all, Springer hit five home runs, tying the World Series record shared by Reggie Jackson and Chase Utley.  He also homered in each of the final four games, setting a World Series record for consecutive games with a home run.  Springer was named the World Series Most Valuable Player (MVP), going 11 for 29 with 7 RBI as the Astros' leadoff hitter.  Other World Series records he set were eight extra base hits (five homers and three doubles) and 29 total bases.  As a side note, he had appeared on a 2014 cover of Sports Illustrated that predicted the Astros' 2017 World Series win.

After the season, Springer was named an American League Silver Slugger Award winner at outfield for the first time in his career.

2018
On the Astros' Opening Day at Globe Life Park in Arlington, Springer led off with a home run against Texas Rangers pitcher Cole Hamels, becoming the first MLB player to lead off with a home run in consecutive Opening Days. He had homered off Mariners pitcher Felix Hernandez in the first inning of Opening Day 2017 at Minute Maid Park.

On May 7, 2018, Springer homered versus the Oakland Athletics and became the first player in Astros franchise history to record six hits in a nine-inning game. Joe Morgan had six hits in a twelve-inning game for the Astros on June 8, 1965.

Springer made his second All-Star appearance in as many seasons, joining five other Astros players and manager A. J. Hinch on the American League All-Star team. Springer went back-to-back with teammate Alex Bregman and hit what would be the deciding home run in the top of the 10th inning at Nationals Park to help lead the American League to an 8–6 victory.

On August 5, Springer sprained his left thumb sliding into second base on a stolen base attempt in a game against the Los Angeles Dodgers and was placed on the 10-Day Disabled List. The Astros struggled through the month of August with injuries to Springer, Carlos Correa, and José Altuve keeping them out of the lineup.  Springer returned to action on August 17 and the Astros held off the charging Oakland A's to win their second straight American League West Division title. Springer finished the season with 22 home runs, 71 RBIs, and batting .265/.346/.434.

Springer started the 2018 postseason off on a strong note, hitting a home run off of Corey Kluber in Game 1 of the 2018 American League Division Series. It was Springer's fifth home run in as many postseason games, tying him with Carlos Beltrán for the club record of consecutive postseason games with a home run. Springer had hit a home run in games 4–7 of the 2017 World Series. Springer then hit two more in Game 3 of the ALDS off of Mike Clevinger and Cody Allen respectively, leading the Astros to an 11–3 victory and a series sweep of the Cleveland Indians. With his home runs in Game 3, Springer became the all-time Astros leader in postseason home runs with 10, again passing Beltrán's 8 from 2004.

2019
On March 28, 2019, Springer tied with Khris Davis of the Oakland Athletics for consecutive Opening Day home runs with three, when he hit a  home run to center field off of reigning Cy Young award winner Blake Snell.  On May 1, Major League Baseball disciplined Springer for anti-gay slur directed at umpire Ángel Hernández, which was caught on camera during a game on April 23. On May 25, Springer was placed on the 10-day IL with a Grade 2 left hamstring strain.

Carrying a .316 batting average, 1.046 OPS, and 18 home runs through June 28, Springer was named a starting outfielder for American League in the All-Star Game.

In 2019, Springer batted .292/.383/.591 with 39 home runs (fifth in the AL) and 96 RBI in 479 at bats over 122 games.  His adjusted OPS+ was 150, ranking fourth.  He placed in the top ten in the league in a number of categories for the first time.  Those included wins above replacement (WAR, 6.4–10th), OBP (eighth), slugging percentage (fourth), OPS (fourth), offensive win percentage (.713, fourth), and at bats per home run (12.3, fourth).  On defense, he was second among all outfielders in total zone runs (19), second among center fielders (eight), and third among right fielders (10).

2020
In 2020, Springer batted .265/.359/.540 with 37 runs, 14 home runs (7th in the AL), 32 RBIs, and hit by pitch five times (tied for eighth in the AL) in 189 at bats.

Toronto Blue Jays

2021
On January 23, 2021, Springer signed a six-year, $150 million contract with the Toronto Blue Jays. He injured his quadriceps in spring training, however, and missed the start of the season. He finally made his debut in the team's 23rd game of the season on April 28. Springer was again placed on the injured list on May 5 with a quad strain. While on the injured list, Springer made his first return to Houston as a Blue Jay in an early-May series, and received a standing ovation. Springer returned to Toronto's lineup on June 22.

On August 2, Springer was named  AL Player of the Week batting .400 with eight runs scored, five doubles, three home runs, seven RBI, six walks, and a .960 slugging percentage over seven games played. On August 9, for the second week in a row, he was named AL Player of the Week after batting .364 with nine runs scored, three doubles, a triple, three home runs, 11 RBI, and a .788 slugging percentage in eight games. Springer suffered a left ankle sprain on August 14 and was placed on the injured list for a third time in 2021. He returned from his third stint on the injured list on August 30.

2022
In 2022, Springer received his fourth All-Star selection and helped lead the Blue Jays to a Wild Card berth. Springer, along with Matt Chapman, got two hits during the first game of the 2022 American League Wild Card Series against the Seattle Mariners. During the eighth inning of the second game, J.P. Crawford hit a ball into the middle of center field. Springer, while trying to catch the ball, collided heavily with Bo Bichette, allowing Crawford to get an RBI double. Springer's injury resulted in him having to be carted off the field. The Mariners would rally from this to complete a two-game series sweep, ending the Blue Jays' season.

Personal life
Springer's grandfather, George, emigrated from Panama at age 17 and pitched for four years at Teachers College of Connecticut, now known as Central Connecticut State University. Springer's father, George Jr., competed in the 1976 Little League World Series and played college football for the UConn Huskies. Springer's mother, Laura, from Utuado, Puerto Rico, competed as a top-level gymnast. Springer has two sisters, Nicole and Lena, both of whom played softball in college.

As a child, Springer attended New Britain Rock Cats games and his favorite baseball player was Torii Hunter, with whom he played catch at eight years old. He also grew up a die-hard Boston Red Sox fan.

Springer has a stutter. He said that it was only after his promotion to the major leagues that he began to accept himself and develop new techniques to help him talk. He performs charity work as a spokesperson for the Stuttering Association for the Young, and hosts an annual bowling benefit in Houston. Springer has participated in a baseball clinic hosted by Matt Barnes at the Newtown, Connecticut, Youth Academy for elementary school students in the aftermath of the Sandy Hook Elementary School shooting.

On January 20, 2018, Springer married Charlise Castro, who played softball for the Albany Great Danes at the University at Albany. They have a son (George Chelston Springer IV).

In March 2020, Springer donated $100,000 to Minute Maid Park employees during the COVID-19 pandemic.

See also

 Houston Astros award winners and league leaders
 List of Houston Astros team records
 List of Major League Baseball single-game hits leaders
 List of University of Connecticut people

References

External links

1989 births
Living people
American League All-Stars
Sportspeople from New Britain, Connecticut
Baseball players from Connecticut
Major League Baseball outfielders
All-American college baseball players
Houston Astros players
Toronto Blue Jays players
UConn Huskies baseball players
Tri-City ValleyCats players
Lancaster JetHawks players
Corpus Christi Hooks players
Oklahoma City RedHawks players
Mesa Solar Sox players
Quad Cities River Bandits players
Wareham Gatemen players
American sportspeople of Panamanian descent
American sportspeople of Puerto Rican descent
World Series Most Valuable Player Award winners
Silver Slugger Award winners
Avon Old Farms alumni
Buffalo Bisons (minor league) players